Kozakia  is a genus of bacteria from the family of Acetobacteraceae. Up to now there is only one species of this genus known (Kozakia baliensis).

References

Further reading 
 
 
 
 

Rhodospirillales
Monotypic bacteria genera
Bacteria genera